Silvio Cesare Bonicelli (31 March 1932 – 6 March 2009) was the Italian Bishop of the Roman Catholic Diocese of Parma from his appointment by Pope John Paul II on 13 December 1996 until his retirement on 19 January 2008.

Bonicelli was born in Bergamo, Italy. He obtained a degree in law in 1954 from the Università cattolica del Sacro Cuore in Milan. He was first ordained a Catholic priest on 16 June 1962. He previously served as the Bishop of the diocese of San Severo before being appointed to the diocese of Parma.

Bishop Silvio Cesare Bonicelli died in Bergamo on 6 March 2009, at the age of 76.

References

Sources

 David M. Cheney, Catholic-hierarchy.org, Bishop Silvio Cesare Bonicelli; retrieved: 26 October 2018.

1932 births
2009 deaths
Bishops of Parma
Clergy from Bergamo
20th-century Italian Roman Catholic bishops